Spicer Adventist University is a Seventh-day Adventist institution of higher learning  in Aundh, Pune, India. It is considered the church's flagship provider of higher education in India. It is a part of the Seventh-day Adventist education system, the world's second largest Christian school system.

History

The history of the college is as old as the history of the Seventh-day Adventist Church in the Southern Asia Division. When the pioneers of the church stepped on the shores of the Indian sub-continent, they established churches and set up schools to provide holistic education for their church members. They also established an institution of higher learning at Coimbatore, Tamil Nadu. In 1915, it was relocated to Bangalore and then in 1942, to Pune. It was Known as Spicer Memorial College  until 2014. Spicer Memorial College was granted University status by Legislative Assembly of Maharashtra on 16 June 2014.

Campus
Some of the major structures in the campus include the administrative building, which houses offices and some classrooms. Then there are separate buildings for the library, the sciences, education, religion, agriculture, the cafeteria, boarders, the college press, industrial arts, Spicer Memorial College Higher Secondary School, Spicer Products and Services.

Student life
The majority of the student body are members of the Seventh-day Adventist Church, and weekly church services are held at the campus church with regular Sabbath observance starting from the time of sunset on Friday to the sunset on Saturday. Friday evening vespers services (AYS) are held weekly as are Religion & Theology Forums. Basketball and football are the major sports on campus.

The college also hosts a local research centre of the Ellen G. White Estate.

The college celebrated a centenary from 28 January – 1 February 2015.

See also 

 List of Seventh-day Adventist colleges and universities
 List of educational institutions in Pune
 List of universities in India

References

External links
Spicer University official website
Spicer on Youtube
Spicer Photos
Spicer College in Flickr*

Adventist universities and colleges in India
Universities in Maharashtra
Ellen G. White Estate
Colleges affiliated to Savitribai Phule Pune University
Universities and colleges in Pune
Educational institutions established in 1915
1915 establishments in India